Jordan Murphy is an American actor, host, and producer.  He has appeared in television advertising for Jardiance, TracFone, HomeAdvisor, and other products and services.

He is perhaps best known for presenting the American reality television series Tool Academy.

Filmography

Films

Television

References

External links

Jordan Murphy commercials on ispot.tvedit
Official Website
BREAKTHROUGHS with Jordan Murphy podcast website 
Subscribe to podcast on iTunes
APPGROOVES Multimedia Director

Year of birth missing (living people)
Living people
American male film actors
American male television actors
American television hosts
American television producers